The 2020–21 Empoli Football Club season was the club's 100th season in existence and the club's second consecutive season in the second division of Italian football. In addition to the domestic league, Empoli participated in this season's edition of the Coppa Italia. The season covered the period from 5 August 2020 to 30 June 2021.

The team achieved a remarkable feat by finishing the season unbeaten at home.

Players

First-team squad

Players out on loan

Transfers

In

Out

Pre-season and friendlies

Competitions

Overview

Serie B

Results summary

Results by round

Matches
The league fixtures were announced on 9 September 2020.

Coppa Italia

Statistics

Goalscorers

Notes

References

External links

Empoli F.C. seasons
Empoli